Rumunki may refer to the following places:
Rumunki, Kuyavian-Pomeranian Voivodeship (north-central Poland)
Rumunki, Gostynin County in Masovian Voivodeship (east-central Poland)
Rumunki, Płock County in Masovian Voivodeship (east-central Poland)
Rumunki, Pomeranian Voivodeship (north Poland)
Rumunki, Warmian-Masurian Voivodeship (north Poland)